André Miguel Pinto Lopes (born 1 December 1996) is a Portuguese professional footballer who plays for Santa Clara as a midfielder.

Club career
On 13 September 2020, Andrezinho  made his professional debut with Mafra in a Liga Portugal 2 match against Cova da Piedade.

Career statistics

References

External links

Stats and profile at LPFP 

1996 births
Living people
People from Alenquer
Sportspeople from Lisbon District
Portuguese footballers
Portuguese expatriate footballers
Association football midfielders
F.C. Alverca players
Casa Pia A.C. players
C.D. Mafra players
FC DAC 1904 Dunajská Streda players
C.D. Santa Clara players
Liga Portugal 2 players
Slovak Super Liga players
Expatriate footballers in Slovakia
Portuguese expatriate sportspeople in Slovakia